Roznov is a town located in Neamț County, Western Moldavia, Romania. Roznov became a town in 2003. Two villages are administered by the town, Chintinici and Slobozia.

Geography
It is situated in the northern part of the Cracău–Bistrița Depression, and lies on the banks of the river Bistrița and its tributaries, the rivers Calul and Iapa.

Roznov is crossed by national road . There is also a train station, that serves the CFR Piatra Neamț – Bacău railway.

History

The town was first mentioned in 15th century documents, and was probably founded by German settlers, along with Târgu Neamț: historians speculate that the original name was Rosenhoff. 

The main church is the Church of Saint Nicholas, situated in a dendrological park. Built between 1884 and 1892 in a Russian style unique to the region, it was founded by the boyar Gheorghe Ruset Roznovanu, whose family had an estate at Roznov for many years. The interior frescoes were completed in 1915 by the artist Costin Petrescu, under the aegis of banker, oil magnate, vineyard owner, and art collector Hector Economos, who bought the Roznov estate after the Ruset Roznovanu family died out. Today the church is an important historical monument.

Economy
The main economy of Roznov consists of the production of adhesives, chemicals used on agriculture, and sulphuric acid.

Natives
 Grigore Cugler

Notes

Populated places in Neamț County
Localities in Western Moldavia
Towns in Romania